Morten Michael Kallevig may refer to:

 Morten Michael Kallevig (1842–1936), Norwegian businessman and politician
 Morten Michael Kallevig (1772–1827), Norwegian businessman